Manthiri Kumari is a 1950 Indian Tamil-language historical fiction film directed by Ellis R. Dungan and starring M. G. Ramachandran, M. N. Nambiar.

Plot 
The King of Mullai Nadu is dominated by his Raja guru (head priest) (M. N. Nambiar). The guru wants his son Parthiban (S. A. Natarajan) to be appointed as the General of the army. But the King appoints Veera Mohan (MGR) instead. The enraged Parthiban becomes a bandit and starts raiding the countryside. Parthiban lives in the kingdom during the daytime and loots merchants and passengers who pass by in groups, in the road during nighttime or at times when no people from Mullai Nadu frequent the roads. He wants to marry the princess Jeevarekha (G. Shakuntala), who is in love with Veera Mohan. Parthiban sends a message to Jeevarekha to meet him secretly. The message is delivered by mistake to the minister's daughter Amudhavalli (Madhuri Devi) and she goes to meet Parthiban. Parthiban and Amudhavalli fall in love. Parthiban just uses Amudhavali for his pleasure. Meanwhile, the king sends his general Veeramohan to capture the bandits plaguing the countryside. Veeramohan captures Parthiban and produces him in the royal court. The Raja guru is enraged and tries to get his son off by various means. He demands a trial for his son in front of the Goddess. During the trial, Amudhavalli hides behind the Goddess statue and pronounces Parthiban as innocent. The minister, who is Amudhavalli's father believes that the statue of goddess spoke to him and announced that Parthiban is innocent. The King never takes decisions on his own, but consults both Raja guru and the Minister. The King, thus believing that the Goddess had spoken, releases Parthiban and exiles Veeramohan. Parthiban and Amudhavalli are happily married. Jeevarekha runs away from the kingdom to be with Veera Mohan in his exile period. Amudhavalli asks Parthiban to promise that he would stop being a bandit or loot the common man. Parthiban however, continues to be bandit by going out, after Amudhavalli goes to sleep. But he is goaded by his father. Parthiban, who wants to take over the kingdom by marrying the princess. Amudhavalli understands this after she gets fooled at night for the second time. Meanwhile, Parthiban's team of bandits attack Veera Mohan, capture Jeevarekha and bring her to bandit Parthiban's den. Amudhavalli follows her husband at night, dresses as a warrior and saves Jeevanrekha, when she catches Parthiban trying to rape Jeevanrekha. Amudhavalli, after catching Parthiban red-handed in bandit's den, decides to take Jeevanrekha to the kingdom. To escape from the nuisance of Amudhavalli, Parthiban decides to kill her. He tricks her into going with him to a cliff edge, he even speaks to her romantically and sings a song and then  tells her of his intention to kill her and discloses that his father also plans to kill the King the same day. Amudavalli begs him for a chance to worship him by going around him three times before she meets her death. Parthiban grants her last wish. While going around him, she pushes him to his death from behind. Shocked by her actions and her husband's betrayal, she confesses her sins and becomes a Buddhist nun. Meanwhile, Veera Mohan decides to go to the kingdom in a disguise to meet Jeevarekha, but sees Rajaguru attempting to murder the King. However, the King mistakes Veeramohan to be the person wanting to kill him. A discussion happens in a courtroom. Amudhavalli is killed by Rajaguru in court when she proved that Veeramohan was never a fraud and that she killed Parthiban. The Raja guru is jailed and Veera Mohan is reunited with the princess.

Cast 
Cast according to the opening credits of the film

Male cast
 M. G. Ramachandar as Veera Mohan
 M. N. Nambiar as Rajaguru
 S. A. Natarajan as Parthiban
 C. V. Nayagam
 Sivasooriyan as King
 K. V. Srinivasan
 A. Karunanidhi as Bhoopalam
 Soundar

Female cast
 Madhuri Devi as Amudhavalli
 Sakunthala as Jeevarekha
 K. S. Angamuthu
 Muthulakshmi as Karpagam

Dance
 Lalitha-Padmini
 Ragini
 Kumari Kamala
 Kumari Vanaja

Production 
Manthiri Kumari was the film version of a play written by M. Karunanidhi and based on an incident that occurs in the Tamil epic poem Kundalakesi (One of the five Great Tamil epics). T. R. Sundaram of Modern Theatres had previously produced a Dungan directed film Ponmudi (1950). Sundaram decided to make a film based on the play and hired Dungan to direct it (the credits show Sundaram and Dungan as co-directors of the film). M. G. Ramachandran (MGR) who had played the supporting roles in many of Dungan's earlier films had recently achieved success as a hero in Rajakumaari (1947) and Marudhanaattu Ilavarasi (1950) was chosen for the lead role in this movie. G. Ramanathan was hired to compose the music. The lyrics for the songs were written by A. Marudhakaasi and Ka. Mu. Sherriff. Though T.M. Soundararajan sang one song that was picturized on a commoner, his contribution was not included in the title credits of playback singers.

Soundtrack 
The film's music was composed by G. Ramanathan. Lyrics were by Ka. Mu. Sheriff, and A. Maruthakasi.

Reception 
The film was released in June 1950 and became a box office hit. Though there is no advertisement of 100 days of this film, Ramachandran's fans claims that it ran more than 100 days in all major cities and 150 days in Chennai, Madurai, Trichy  146 days. Such claims are common among fans. Though MGR was the hero, it was S. A. Natarajan's role which received the most acclaim. Karunanidhi's fiery dialogues became famous and stirred controversy.

References

External links 

1950 films
1950s historical films
1950s Tamil-language films
Films based on poems
Films directed by Ellis R. Dungan
Films scored by G. Ramanathan
Films with screenplays by M. Karunanidhi
Indian black-and-white films
Indian films based on plays
Indian historical films